Maryna Mikolaevna Cherniak (born March 26, 1988) is a Ukrainian judoka.

Career
Her twin sister Inna is visually impaired, but competes in judo and sambo both against sighted and visually impaired people. To avoid competing against each other the sisters often split the events. For example, at the 2013 World Championships, Inna competed in the 52 kg and Maryna in the 48 kg division. At the 2013 Universiade, both sisters won medals in the 52 kg category, but Inna in sambo and Maryna in judo. In 2016, Inna won a gold medal in judo at the 2016 Summer Paralympics, while Maryna was eliminated in her second bout at the 2016 Summer Olympics.

References

External links
 

1988 births
Living people
Ukrainian female judoka
Olympic judoka of Ukraine
Judoka at the 2016 Summer Olympics
Twin sportspeople
Ukrainian twins
Universiade medalists in judo
Universiade bronze medalists for Ukraine
European Games competitors for Ukraine
Judoka at the 2015 European Games
Judoka at the 2019 European Games
Medalists at the 2013 Summer Universiade
21st-century Ukrainian women